On July 27, 2007, French President Nicolas Sarkozy delivered a speech at Cheikh Anta Diop University in Dakar, Senegal. The speech, known in France as the Discours de Dakar (Dakar address), drew criticism from Africans who disagreed with Sarkozy's statement that "the tragedy of Africa is that the African has not fully entered into history... They have never really launched themselves into the future."

The speech came as part of a foreign trip with then-wife Cécilia Attias, anticipated as an effort to repair French relations with the continent after Sarkozy's predecessor Jacques Chirac had been perceived as supporting authoritarian governments in former French colonies.

References

External links
French text of Sarkozy's Dakar Address reprinted by Le Monde
Unofficial English translation of Sarkozy's Dakar Address at AfricaResource.com

2007 speeches
21st century in France
21st century in Senegal
History of colonialism
Postcolonialism
Nicolas Sarkozy